Srinidhi Ramesh Shetty (born 21 October 1992) is an Indian actress, model and the winner of the Miss Supranational 2016 pageant. Shetty was crowned as Miss Diva Supranational 2016 at the Miss Diva 2016 pageant and later represented India at Miss Supranational 2016, which she won. She is the second Indian representative to have won this title. Shetty made her acting debut with the Kannada film K.G.F: Chapter 1 (2018).

Early life and education
Srinidhi Ramesh Shetty was born on 21 October 1992, in a Mangalorean family of Tuluvas belonging to the Bunt. Her father Ramesh Shetty is from the town of Mulki, and her mother Kushala is from Thalipady Guthu, Kinnigoli.

She was educated at Sri Narayana Guru English Medium School, followed by a pre-university course at St. Aloysius Pre-University College. She received a Bachelor of Electrical Engineering degree from Jain University, Bangalore, and graduated with distinction.

Pageantry
In 2012, Srinidhi competed in the Clean & Clear-sponsored Fresh Face contest, where she was among the top two finalists. Later, she participated in Manappuram Miss South India in 2015 and won the titles of Miss Karnataka and Miss Beautiful Smile, and later participated in Manappuram Miss Queen of India where she was crowned as the 1st runner up and also named Miss Congeniality. She also worked as a model while employed at Accenture.

In 2016, she participated in the 2016 Miss Diva pageant, where she was selected as a finalist and won the Miss Supranational India 2016 title. She also won three subtitles for her smile, body and her photogenic face. She went on to represent India at Miss Supranational 2016. On 2 December 2016, she was crowned Miss Supranational 2016 by her predecessor Stephania Stegman of Paraguay in Municipal Sports and Recreation Center, Krynica-Zdrój, Poland. She also won the title of Miss Supranational Asia and Oceania 2016 in the pageant.

During her reign as Miss Supranational 2016, Srinidhi traveled to United Arab Emirates, France, Japan, Singapore, Thailand, Slovakia and numerous trips around Poland and India.

Acting career

Shetty made her acting debut with the 2018 Kannada period action film, K.G.F: Chapter 1 opposite Yash. It was directed by Prashanth Neel. She portrayed a head strong girl, Reena Desai. The performances of every actor was praised. The film was a box office success, grossing ₹250 crore. 

In 2022, she reprised her role of Reena in the film's sequel, K.G.F: Chapter 2. Shetty's character became widely recognised, while the film received positive review. With earnings of ₹1,200–1,250 crore globally, it is the highest grossing Indian film of 2022 and third highest-grossing Indian film. The same year, she made her Tamil debut with action thriller film Cobra alongside Vikram. The film was a box-office bomb collecting  ₹40 crore. Shetty portrayed Bhavana Menon, a criminology professor, India Today said her character was "insignificant".. It was reported that Shetty is to make her Telugu debut in the Sailesh Kolanu directorial Saindhav alongside Venkatesh, this news is yet to be announced.

Filmography

Films

Accolades

References

External links
 

Living people
Tulu people
Female models from Karnataka
Indian beauty pageant winners
1992 births
Miss Supranational winners
Actresses in Kannada cinema
Indian film actresses
Actresses from Mangalore